Michael Murray Buchanan (March 1, 1932 – January 3, 2017) was a Canadian ice hockey defenceman.

Buchanan played one game in the National Hockey League for the Chicago Black Hawks during the 1951–52 NHL season, having also played two games in the American Hockey League for the St. Louis Flyers. He played two seasons for the Fort Wayne Komets of the International Hockey League before opting to enroll at the University of Michigan and played for their Wolverines for the next two years.  He was selected for the NCAA West First All-American Team in 1955.  He returned to hockey in 1957 for a season in England with the Wembley Lions before retiring for good in 1958. He died in 2017 at the age of 84.

Awards and honors

See also
List of players who played only one game in the NHL

References

External links
 

1932 births
2017 deaths
Canadian ice hockey defencemen
Chicago Blackhawks players
Fort Wayne Komets players
Galt Black Hawks players
Ice hockey people from Ontario
Michigan Wolverines men's ice hockey players
St. Louis Flyers players
Sportspeople from Sault Ste. Marie, Ontario
NCAA men's ice hockey national champions